Cees Links (born in 1957 in Amsterdam, The Netherlands) is a Dutch entrepreneur and the founder and CEO of GreenPeak Technologies (2004), a fabless semiconductor company for Smart Home and Internet of things (IoT) applications, in 2016 sold to Qorvo Inc., a USA-based semi-conductor/technology company.

Career
Upon graduation from the University of Twente in 1982, Links started his career at NCR Corporation. As product manager, he was responsible for the first concept development and launch of the world's first wireless LAN product in 1990, WaveLAN, a major innovation at that time. Throughout several acquisitions and divestitures (NCR, AT&T, Lucent Technologies and Agere Systems), Links continued his work in the wireless LAN area, which he turned into a multi-hundred million dollar business for Agere Systems. Links started as product manager, responsible for the initial Wi-Fi marketing and concept creation and in 1996 became general manager of the Wi-Fi business unit. 
He directly closed the deal with Steve Jobs at Apple Computer in 1999 that ignited the growth of the wireless LAN industry. Through this deal, wireless LANs went on to become the standard communication feature as Wi-Fi is known today.

Links has also been involved with wireless next-generation technology breakthroughs in the Zigbee Alliance, now the Connectivity Standards Alliance (CSA), and the IoT. From 1991 until 2002, Links was involved in the establishment of the IEEE 802.11 standardization committee and the Wi-Fi Alliance. He was also instrumental in helping to establish the IEEE 802.15 standardization committee to become the basis for the Zigbee/Thread/Matter sense and control networking technology and standardization.

GreenPeak Technologies
In 2004 Links founded GreenPeak Technologies (originally under the stealth name of Xanadu Wireless), where he was CEO. GreenPeak is a fabless semiconductor company with a strong focus on wireless for sense and control networks in Smart Home and Internet of Things applications. Links got the company launched and uniquely positioned in the market. He has grown the team to +100 people and accelerated growth.

In May 2016, GreenPeak Technologies was acquired by Qorvo.

Awards
Links was recognized in January 2017 as Wi-Fi pioneer with the Golden Mousetrap Lifetime Achievement award.

In May 2019, Wireless technology innovator Cees Links inducted into Wi-Fi NOW Hall of Fame 

On 29 October 2019, the WaveLAN team received an IEEE Milestone Award, where WaveLAN was recognized as the precursor of Wi-Fi, leading to the formation of the IEEE 802.11 Working Group for Wireless Local Area Networks. During this celebration event that took place in the City Hall of Nieuwegein, the Netherlands, the town where most of the WaveLAN developments had taken place. During that event, Links received an honorary citizenship of the City of Nieuwegein.

Early life, education and personal life
Links was born in 1957 and raised in Amsterdam, the son of Piet Links, a mathematics teacher, who taught Cees the love for numbers and analytics, and Thea van der Kolk. He has 6 siblings. During his study his favourite subject was the transition of “data” into “information”, how numbers can become meaningful to communicate information for solving problems. “Information Links” was the name of his first company that he started in 1979. From his upbringing “meaningful” was a key word, which for him turned into “A connected world is a better world”, explaining his passion for continuous improvement of communication.

Links holds a master's degree in Applied Mathematics and a Bachelor of Electrical Engineering from the Twente University of Technology in Enschede, the Netherlands. He graduated from an Advanced Business Management Course from the Fuqua School of Business, Duke University, Durham NC, USA.

Links lives in Maarssen, the Netherlands. He is married to Angela Champness, father of five and grandfather of three.

Publications
Author of the book: “The Spirit of Wi-Fi”, about the Wi-Fi history. Subtitle: “Wi-Fi: where it so suddenly came from, where it is today and where it is going in the future.”

Professor Wolter Lemstra for TU Delft wrote an in-depth study on “The Innovation Journey of Wi-Fi”, issued by Cambridge Press and explaining Cees' role in the development of Wi-Fi.

References

1957 births
Living people
Engineers from Amsterdam
Radio pioneers
Businesspeople from Amsterdam
Dutch corporate directors
Dutch chief executives in the technology industry
University of Twente